VOEA Ngahau Siliva (P302) is the second of Tonga's two s.  She is the eighth vessel of the 21 vessels in her class.

Design

After the United Nations Convention on the Law of the Sea established that all maritime nation were entitled to exercise control over a  exclusive economic zone, Australia agreed to give small patrol boats to Tonga and eleven other neighbours in the Pacific Islands Forum.

Those vessels were designed to have a working life of at least 30 years, so Australia designed the Guardian class, a slightly larger, and more capable replacement class. Australia delivered her sister ship, the third vessel of her class, to Tonga on June 21, 2019.

Operational career

She was formally handed over to Tonga on 30 October 2020, at Austal's shipyard in Henderson, Western Australia.  The handover was attended by High Commissioner Princess Angelika Latufuipeka Tuku’aho and Lieutenant Colonel Tevita Siu Fifita, representing Tonga, and Melissa Price the Minister for Defence Industry and Rear Admiral Wendy Malcolm, representing Australia.

The vessel arrived at her home port, Nuku'alofa, on 16 December 2020.  To prevent the possibility of spreading infection of the COVID-19 virus her crew were placed under quarantine.

HM King Tupou VI commissioned the vessel on January 27, 2021.

References

Guardian class patrol vessels
Naval ships of Tonga
2020 ships
Ships built by Austal